The South African National Schools Moot Court Competition is an annual moot court competition established in 2011 aimed at creating greater consciousness and understanding in South African schools and communities about the Constitution of the Republic of South Africa and the values embodied by it through the active participation of learners in a moot court competition.

The finalists automatically qualify to represent South Africa at the International Schools Moot Court Competition, hosted in the Hague, in the Netherlands. South African law school.

Format

The moot is divided into written and oral rounds. All secondary schools in South Africa are invited to send a team of two grade-10 or 11 learners to submit two short essays, each arguing the opposing view of the set fictional question. A panel of experts evaluate the submissions and select the four best submissions from each of South Africa's nine provinces which are then invited to the semi-final oral rounds held at the University of Pretoria, with the winners arguing in the final round at the Constitutional Court of South Africa, Johannesburg. In the inaugural competition, 32 teams competed in the provincial rounds. However, as of 2019, the Moot problem has been made a part of the school curriculum, reaching a potential 2 million learners.

The moot court is organised and supported by the Department of Basic Education, Department of Justice and Constitutional Development, South African Human Rights Commission, and University of Pretoria Faculty of Law.

Judges

Winners

See also
Moot court
List of law schools in South Africa
World Human Rights Moot Court Competition
African Human Rights Moot Court Competition

References

Moot court competitions
Human rights organisations based in South Africa
Competitions in South Africa
2011 establishments in South Africa
Recurring events established in 2011